Ait Aissi Ihahane is a small town and rural commune in Essaouira Province of the Marrakech-Tensift-Al Haouz region of Morocco. At the time of the 2004 census, the commune had a total population of 5437 people living in 928 households.

References

Populated places in Essaouira Province
Rural communes of Marrakesh-Safi